Draposa lyrivulva, is a species of spider of the genus Draposa. It is native to Pakistan, India and Sri Lanka. Its presence in Japan is doubtful, and therefore excluded from their Japanese spiders checklist.

See also
 List of Lycosidae species

References

Lycosidae
Invertebrates of Pakistan
Spiders of Asia
Spiders described in 1906